Sir Percy Lyham Loraine, 12th Baronet,  (5 November 1880 – 23 May 1961) was a British diplomat. He was British High Commissioner to Egypt from 1929 to 1933, British Ambassador to Turkey from 1933 to 1939 and British Ambassador to Italy from 1939 to 1940. In later life he was involved in breeding thoroughbreds for horse racing and won the 2000 Guineas Stakes in 1954 with Darius. He was the last of the Loraine baronets, having no sons to succeed him.

Early life
Loraine was born in London on 5 November 1880 the second son of Admiral Sir Lambton Loraine, the 11th Baronet and his wife Frederica Mary née Broke. Educated at Eton College from 1893 until 1899 when he went to New College, Oxford. In 1899 at the start of the Second Boer War he joined the Imperial Yeomanry and served on active duty in South Africa until 1902. In 1904, he joined the diplomatic service.

Diplomatic career
He first served in the Middle East, at the British missions in Istanbul and Tehran, where he was Envoy Extraordinary and Minister Plenipotentiary 1921–26, before being posted in Rome, Peking, Paris and Madrid. He took part in the 1919 Paris Peace Conference which was held following the end of World War I, before being sent as minister in Tehran and then Athens.

In 1929, he was appointed as High Commissioner for Egypt and the Sudan. However, his policy of allowing King Fuad I to control the government led to his removal in 1933.

He became close to Turkish President Mustafa Kemal Atatürk while serving in Ankara, which improved the relations between the two countries. While ambassador, Loraine visited Atatürk on his deathbed and later gave a BBC broadcast paying tribute to Atatürk on the 10th anniversary of his death.

He was the last British ambassador to Italy before the start of World War II. Loraine was reputedly nicknamed 'pompous Percy' by his staff. Winston Churchill did not seek his advice on Middle Eastern matters during the war, and he retired from public life.

Later life
Loraine retired from his diplomatic career in 1940. He took an interest in horse racing and thoroughbred horse breeding: his horse Darius won the 2000 Guineas in 1954. He worked for the Jockey Club on the introduction of photo-finish cameras to racing.

He died at his London home on 23 May 1961 aged 80. He had no children and the baronetcy became extinct.

Honours
Loraine was appointed a Privy Counsellor in 1933, a CMG in 1921, KCMG in 1925 and GCMG in 1937.

Personal life
His brother Eustace died unmarried in an aircraft accident 1912 so when his father died in 1917 he succeeded as the 12th baronet. In 1924 Percy Loraine married Louise Violet Beatrice, daughter of Major-General Edward Montagu-Stuart-Wortley, brother of the 2nd Earl of Wharncliffe. Sir Percy lived at Styford Hall, Stocksfield-on-Tyne, and at Wilton Crescent, Belgravia. His friends included Gertrude Bell, fellow diplomat Sir Lancelot Oliphant, and Sir Arnold Wilson.

References

General

External links
 

1880 births
1961 deaths
Alumni of New College, Oxford
Baronets in the Baronetage of England
Ambassadors of the United Kingdom to Iran
Ambassadors of the United Kingdom to Italy
Ambassadors of the United Kingdom to Turkey
High Commissioners of the United Kingdom to Egypt
British Army personnel of the Second Boer War
Knights Grand Cross of the Order of St Michael and St George
Members of the Privy Council of the United Kingdom
People educated at Eton College
Ambassadors of the United Kingdom to Greece
Imperial Yeomanry officers
People from Stocksfield